Víctor Irving Santos (born 2 October 1976 or possibly earlier) is a Dominican former professional baseball player.

Early life
Santos was born in San Pedro de Macorís, Dominican Republic. As with many Dominican players, it is unclear whether Santos's official age is accurate. His biography lists that he graduated from Passaic High School in Passaic, New Jersey in 1995, though Santos was a four-year starter on the baseball team at Saint Peter's College in Jersey City, New Jersey. In 1994, he was named Most Valuable Player of the Metro Atlantic Athletic Conference baseball tournament, where he was the winning pitcher twice in the Peacocks' three-game sweep. Santos is the first former Peacock baseball player to reach the majors.

Professional career
Santos signed with the Detroit Tigers as a non-drafted free agent in 1995. In 2001, Santos was named Tigers Rookie of the Year. Although he allowed some unearned runs, Santos posted a 0.00 ERA over his first 27.1 innings in the majors, the longest such streak to start a career since Fernando Valenzuela of the Los Angeles Dodgers in 1980–81 (34 innings). For his effort, he was named Detroit rookie of the year by the Detroit Sports Broadcasters Association.

Santos was traded to the Colorado Rockies for José Paniagua in 2002 and acquired by the Texas Rangers before the 2003 season. Then he signed a minor league contract with the Milwaukee Brewers before being called up for the 2004 season, where he earned his way onto the starting rotation.  After two years with Milwaukee, he made an unusual route via the Kansas City Royals and the Rule 5 draft onto the major-league roster of the Pittsburgh Pirates for the 2006 season.

The Pirates granted him free agency on October 6, 2006, immediately after the 2006 season ended. On January 8, 2007 he signed a minor league deal with the Reds. On September 7, 2007 he was traded to the Baltimore Orioles for cash considerations.

Santos elected free agency on October 12, 2007. On January 11, 2008, Santos signed with the San Francisco Giants to a minor league contract with an invitation to spring training. He became a free agent at the end of the season. After splitting the 2009 season between the independent Newark Bears and the Vaqueros Laguna, he played with the Vaqueros again in 2010, appearing in 10 games with a 3-4 record.

Personal life
Santos has been a resident of Woodland Park, New Jersey.

References

External links
, or Retrosheet

1976 births
Living people
Águilas Cibaeñas players
Baltimore Orioles players
Baseball players from New Jersey
Cañeros de Los Mochis players
Cincinnati Reds players
Colorado Rockies players
Colorado Springs Sky Sox players
Detroit Tigers players
Dominican Republic expatriate baseball players in Mexico
Dominican Republic expatriate baseball players in the United States
Fresno Grizzlies players
Gulf Coast Tigers players
Indianapolis Indians players
Jacksonville Suns players
Lakeland Tigers players
Leones del Escogido players
Louisville Bats players
Major League Baseball pitchers
Major League Baseball players from the Dominican Republic
Mexican League baseball pitchers
Milwaukee Brewers players
Navegantes del Magallanes players
Newark Bears players
Oklahoma RedHawks players
Passaic High School alumni
Sportspeople from San Pedro de Macorís
People from Woodland Park, New Jersey
Pittsburgh Pirates players
Saint Peter's Peacocks baseball players
Senadores de San Juan players
Dominican Republic expatriate baseball players in Puerto Rico
Sportspeople from Passaic, New Jersey
Texas Rangers players
Vaqueros Laguna players
Dominican Republic expatriate baseball players in Venezuela